Pseudotetracha basalis is a species of tiger beetle in the subfamily Cicindelinae that was described by William John Macleay in 1866. It is endemic to Australia.

References

Beetles described in 1866
Endemic fauna of Australia
Beetles of Australia